Alex Mar is a documentary filmmaker and writer based in New York City. Her work centers on belief systems and subcultures.

Films 
Mar's film American Mystic premiered at the Tribeca Film Festival in 2010. Five years in the making, the film focuses on three members of fringe religious communities: Morpheus, a Pagan priestess building a spiritual sanctuary in rural California; Kublai, a Spiritualist medium working on a farm in upstate New York; and Chuck, a Lakota Sioux, raising his family according to his ancestors' way of life.

Writing 
Mar's first book, Witches of America, was published in 2015. It was a New York Times Notable Book for 2015.

The book is both a memoir and an exploration of contemporary occult practice in the United States. The book traces a brief history of contemporary occult practice, from Aleister Crowley and the Ordo Templi Orientis to contemporary Gnostic Masses held in New Orleans. She also explores her personal relationship with Morpheus Ravenna, a Feri witch she met during the filming of American Mystic. In the book, Mar also takes on the spiritual training required to be initiated into the Feri tradition and explores her own relationship to mysticism and ritual, as the daughter of Cuban and Greek immigrants.

Although the book was received favorably by critics, it was controversial within the Pagan community.

Mar's essays have appeared in The New York Times Book Review, The Believer, Wired, and the Oxford American. She has written about contemporary Catholic nuns in Houston, Texas; the Church of Satan; the "body farm" at the Forensic Anthropology Center (FACTS), Texas State University San Marcos, and the development of human-like androids in Japan. In 2018, she was nominated for a National Magazine Award for Feature Writing.

References

External links 
Witches of America website
The Believer (articles by Alex Mar in the Believer)
Oxford American (articles by Alex Mar in Oxford American)
Wired (articles by Alex Mar in Wired)

Year of birth missing (living people)
Living people
American documentary filmmakers
American people of Cuban descent
American people of Greek descent
American spiritual writers
Writers from New York City
21st-century American non-fiction writers
American women non-fiction writers
21st-century American women writers
American women documentary filmmakers